is an opera (intermezzo giocoso) in two acts composed by Giuseppe Scarlatti to an Italian libretto by Marco Coltellini. It was originally written for the wedding celebration of Jan Nepomuk, the eldest son and heir-apparent of Prince Joseph Adam I of Schwarzenberg, and premiered at the theatre in the Český Krumlov Castle in Český Krumlov on 24 July 1768.

The first modern revival of Dove è amore è gelosia was staged at the Baroque Theatre of Český Krumlov Castle, the site of its original premiere, on 9 September 2011.  This performed was recorded and released in DVD and blu-ray by Opus Arte.

The music to one of Patrizio's arias, "A che serve intisichire" has been noted to share a degree of similarity with Cherubino's aria, "Non so più cosa son" from Mozart's Le Nozze di Figaro, which was composed 18 years later.

Roles

References 

Operas by Giuseppe Scarlatti
1768 operas
Italian-language operas
Operas